Giuliano Simeone Baldini (born 18 December 2002) is an Argentine professional footballer who plays as a forward for Spanish club Real Zaragoza, on loan from Atlético Madrid.

Career
Born in Rome when his father was playing for Lazio, Simeone returned to Argentina to live with his mother at the age of four, and began his career with River Plate. In September 2019, he moved to Atlético Madrid's youth categories; as River did not have a professional contract, the club was unable to retain him, and the move was later approved by FIFA. He then joined the Juvenil squad.

Simeone made his senior debut with Atletis B-team on 17 January 2021, starting and scoring the opener in a 1–1 Segunda División B away draw against UD Poblense. He scored three further goals in the season, but suffered team relegation.

After spending the 2021 pre-season with the first team, Simeone returned to the B's now in Tercera División RFEF, scoring eight goals in 11 matches between the months of November and December. He debuted with the senior Atlético Madrid side in a 0–0 La Liga tie with Granada on 20 April 2022, coming on as a sub in the 91st minute.

On 4 July 2022, Simeone was loaned to Segunda División side Real Zaragoza for the season.

Personal life
Simeone is the son of football manager Diego Simeone. His brothers Giovanni and Gianluca are also footballers.

Career statistics

References

External links

2002 births
Living people
Footballers from Rome
Argentine footballers
Italian footballers
Argentine people of Italian descent
Italian people of Argentine descent
Association football forwards
La Liga players
Segunda División B players
Tercera Federación players
Atlético Madrid B players
Atlético Madrid footballers
Real Zaragoza players
Italian expatriate footballers
Argentine expatriate footballers
Expatriate footballers in Spain
Argentine expatriate sportspeople in Spain
Italian expatriate sportspeople in Spain
Simeone family